Irwell River may refer to:

River Irwell in North West England
Irwell River, New Zealand